Saetta Learns to Live (Italian: Saetta impara a vivere) is a 1924 Italian silent film directed by Guido Brignone and starring Domenico Gambino and Pauline Polaire. It was made by the Turin-based Fert Film.

Cast
 Domenico Gambino as Saetta  
 Pauline Polaire 
 Rita D'Harcourt 
 Liliana Ardea 
 Alberto Collo 
 Giuseppe Brignone 
 Franz Sala 
 Armand Pouget 
 Augusto Bandini

References

Bibliography
 Jacqueline Reich. The Maciste Films of Italian Silent Cinema. Indiana University Press, 2015.

External links

1924 films
1920s Italian-language films
Films directed by Guido Brignone
Italian silent feature films
Italian black-and-white films